"" is the national anthem of Albania, adopted in 1912. Its music is derived from the Romanian patriotic song "Pe-al nostru steag e scris Unire", composed by Ciprian Porumbescu. The lyrics, which are close to the original Romanian lyrics, were written by Albanian poet Asdreni. The anthem was originally titled "" ("The Pledge on the Flag").

History

It was later printed in a volume of poems by Drenova titled  (Dreams and tears) which was published in Bucharest. According to Lasgush Poradeci's memoirs, the anthem, created by the adaptation of the text to the music, was not originally intended to be a national anthem, but it was so well liked by the people that it was proclaimed as the national anthem in 1912, and it was with its music that the Albanian flag was raised during the Albanian Proclamation of Independence in Vlore.

Music
A Hungarian musicologist, György Ligeti, opined that the music composed by Porumbescu is rooted in Germanic and Austrian musical traditions, though this is not a definitive groundbreaking explanation of its influence and later creation. It is a view based on Porumbescu's musical education, since he had studied at the University of Music and Performing Arts, Vienna. The view has been shared by Albanian musicologist, Ramadan Sokoli.

Lyrics
The second half of each verse is considered refrain and is repeated. Usually, in sports events among national teams, only the first verse is performed.

Official lyrics

In other alphabets
Albanian alphabet has historically been written in a number of different alphabets.

Notes

References

External links

 Himni Kombëtar i Republikës së Shqipërisë
 "Hymni i Flamurit" - nga Fan Noli

European anthems
Albanian-language songs
National symbols of Albania
1912 songs
National anthems
National anthem compositions in G major